Darreh Chenar (also Romanized as Darreh Chenār and Darreh-ye Chenār; also known as Dar-i-Chinār and Darreh Chinār) is a village in Kamazan-e Sofla Rural District, Zand District, Malayer County, Hamadan Province, Iran. At the 2006 census, its population was 182, in 49 families.

References 

Populated places in Malayer County